The 2009–10 San Jose State Spartans men's basketball team represented San Jose State University during the 2009–10 NCAA Division I men's basketball season. This was George Nessman's fifth season as head coach. The Spartans played their home games at The Event Center and competed in the Western Athletic Conference (WAC). San Jose State finished the season 14–17, and 6–10 in WAC play and lost in the quarterfinals of the 2010 WAC men's basketball tournament to New Mexico State.

Preseason roster changes

Recruits

Preseason
In the WAC preseason polls, released October 20 via media teleconference San Jose State was selected to finish 8th in the coaches and media poll.

Roster

2009–10 schedule and results
Source
All times are Pacific

|-
!colspan=9| 2010 WAC men's basketball tournament

Season highlights
On December 21, Jr. Adrian Oliver was named the WAC player of the week for the sixth week of the season with weekly averages of 31.0 PPG, 8.0 RPG, 2.0 AST, 2.0 Steals, 1.0 Block and 52.6 FG%.

On January 25, Oliver again was named the WAC player of the week for the eleventh week of the season with weekly averages of 30.5 PPG, 5. AST, 3.0 RPG, 2.0 Steals and 54.3 FG%. Oliver was the first player in the WAC to be awarded the WAC Player of the Week twice during the 2009–10 season. On January 26 Olvier was also named the Oscar Robertson National Player of the Week by the U.S. Basketball Writers Association for games ending the week of January 24.

References

San Jose State
San Jose State Spartans men's basketball seasons
San Jose State Spartans men's basketball
San Jose State Spartans men's basketball